Simion Ghimpu (May 24, 1939 in Coloniţa – July 27, 2010) was a writer from Moldova.

Biography
Simion Ghimpu was born to Irina and Toader Ghimpu on May 24, 1939; he had four siblings: Gheorghe, Visarion, Valentina, and Mihai. Simion Ghimpu graduated from the Moldova State University in 1964 and got a PhD from the Russian Academy of Theatre Arts from Moscow in 1969. Simion Ghimpu worked for the Art Institute of Chişinău (1969–2000).

Simion Ghimpu is a member of the Moldovan Writers' Union and a lyricist. Simion Ghimpu created lyrics for over 100 songs, together with composers Eugen Doga, Ion Aldea Teodorovici, M. Dolgan, I. Enache, O. Milștein, Al. Sochireanschi, N. Carajia, A. Bivol, M. Oțel, C. Rusnac, A. Chiriac, E. Mamot, D. Radu,
A. Luxemburg, D. Mateevici, S. Lăsoi, O. Ababii. Among them were the Moldovan hits: „Numai tu”, „Ce rost are?”, „Amor, amor”, „Lacrimă”, „Casa noastră”. Songs with his lyrics are performed by the bands Noroc and Orizont, by singers: Ion Suruceanu, Sofia Rotaru, Nadejda Cepraga, Anastasia Lazariuc, Nina Crulicovschi, Fratii Bivol, Olga Ciolacu, Alexandru Lozanciuc, Radu Dolgan, Ana Barbu, Aurel Margine and folk singers: Larisa Arsenie, Anatol Dincu, Nicolae Cibotaru.

Simion Ghimpu died on July 27, 2010. The body of late Simion Ghimpu was kept at the Moldovan Writers' Union on July 28 to allow people to pay their last respects. Politicians and writers like Ion Hadârcă, Mihai Cimpoi and Ion Ciocanu attended his funeral ceremony, which took place at the St. Teodora de la Sihla Church on July 29, 2010. Traian Băsescu and Mikheil Saakashvili expressed their condolences to Mihai Ghimpu; "In the last decade you've lost two brothers and Romanians lost two patriots dedicated to the Romanian culture and civilization" wrote Băsescu.

Awards
 Simion Ghimpu with the volume "Life Within a Hair's Breadth of Death" won the Prize for Prose.

Works
 „Jeep-ul şi Sania de la Coloniţa” (2008)
 „Mereu”, poems, ed. Hyperion (1995)
 „Reversul sentimentelor”, poems, editura Ruxanda (2000)
 „Dincolo”, poems, 2003; editura Pontos
 „Ghici, ce-s?” (2003)
 „Descifrări”, poems (2004)
 Stare de spirit (2007)
 „Viaţă pe muchie de cuţit”, roman autobiographic (2009)
 Ia să-mi spui tu, spui (2008)
 Plai de cînt, plai de dor (1981)

Gallery

References

Bibliography 
 Literatura şi arta Moldovei: Encicl. - Vol.1. - Chişinău, 1985.
 Mihai Cimpoi, O istorie deschisă a literaturii române din Basarabia. - Chişinău, 1996.
 Chişinău, Enciclopedie, 1997, Ed. Museum

External links 
 Ghimpu Simion
 Simion Ghimpu: „Sunt orbit de o lumină cerească”
 Simion Ghimpu
 Poetul Simion Ghimpu a aniversat 70 de ani!

1939 births
2010 deaths
People from Colonița
Writers from Chișinău
Eastern Orthodox Christians from Moldova
Moldovan male writers
Moldova State University alumni
Russian Academy of Theatre Arts alumni